In algebraic geometry, Bloch's higher Chow groups, a generalization of Chow group, is a precursor and a basic example of motivic cohomology (for smooth varieties). It was introduced by Spencer Bloch  and the basic theory has been developed by Bloch and Marc Levine.

In more precise terms, a theorem of Voevodsky implies: for a smooth scheme X over a field and integers p, q, there is a natural isomorphism

between motivic cohomology groups and higher Chow groups.

Motivation 
One of the motivations for higher Chow groups comes from homotopy theory. For example,can be thought of as the homotopy classes of cycles whilecan be thought of as the homotopy classes of homotopies of cycles.

Definition 
Let X be a quasi-projective algebraic scheme over a field (“algebraic” means separated and of finite type).

For each integer , define

which is an algebraic analog of a standard q-simplex.

For each i, there is the embedding

Since  is an effective Cartier divisor, there is the Gysin homomorphism:
,
that (by definition) maps a subvariety V to the intersection 

Define the boundary operator  which yields the chain complex

Finally, the q-th higher Chow group of X is defined as the q-th homology of the above complex:

(More simply, since  is naturally a simplicial abelian group, in view of the Dold–Kan correspondence, higher Chow groups can also be defined as homotopy groups .)

For example, if  is a closed subvariety such that the intersections  with the faces  are proper, then
 the r-th Chow group of X.

Properties

Functoriality 
Proper maps  are covariant between the higher chow groups while flat maps are contravariant.

Homotopy invariance 
If  is an algebraic vector bundle, then there is the homotopy equivalence

Localization 
Given a closed equidimensional subscheme  there is a localization long exact sequencewhere . In particular, this shows the higher chow groups naturally extend the exact sequence of chow groups.

Localization theorem 

is a homotopy equivalence. In particular, if  has pure codimension, then it yields the long exact sequence for higher Chow groups (called the localization sequence).

References 

Peter Haine, An Overview of Motivic Cohomology
Vladmir Voevodsky, “Motivic cohomology groups are isomorphic to higher Chow groups in any characteristic,” International Mathematics Research Notices 7 (2002), 351–355.

Algebraic geometry